Mercy Adu Gyamfi (born 1 May 1971) is a Ghanaian Parliamentarian, a member of the New Patriotic Party, the majority group in parliament and a member of the Seventh Parliament of the Fourth Republic of Ghana. She is married with six kids.

Early life
Mercy Adu-Gyamfi comes from Akwatia, in the Eastern Region, of Ghana and was born on 1 May 1971.

Education
Mrs. Mercy Adu-Gyamfi attended Presby Middle School in Akwatia and in the year 1988 she obtained the Middle School Leaving Certificate. (MSLC).

Career
She is a business woman and a hair dresser by profession and became a member of Ghana's parliament in December 2016 when she won the seat for Akwatia constituency in the Eastern Region. She was a managing director, of Amasey Pharmacy, in Kade, in the Eastern Region. She is a member of some committees in Parliament, she serves on the Committee on Employment and social welfare house committee. She obtained 21,433 votes out of the 37,716 valid votes cast, equivalent to 57,21% over her opponents Baba Jamal Mohammed Ahmed and Joice Sakei.

Personal life 
Mercy Adu Gyamfi is married with six children. She is a Christian and a member of the Church Of Pentecost.

References

Living people
Women members of the Parliament of Ghana
1971 births
Ghanaian MPs 2017–2021
Ghanaian Pentecostals
21st-century Ghanaian women politicians